Oscar Rasbach (August 2, 1888 – March 23, 1975) was an American pianist and composer and arranger of art songs and works for piano.

Biography
Oscar was born in Kentucky, but studied "academic subjects in Los Angeles". He also studied music with Ludwig Thomas, Julius Albert Jahn, José Anderson, and A. J. Stamm.  He became a businessman, but went to Vienna to study piano with Theodor Leschetizky and music theory with Hans Thorton.  He returned to the United States in 1911 and settled in San Marino, California.  There he worked as a pianist, accompanist, teacher, and choral director. His obituary in the local news and the Musical Times claimed that he was a founding member of ASCAP, but the 1966 ASCAP Dictionary says that he joined in 1932.

Music
Rasbach composed two operettas, around 20 published songs, solos for student pianists, and a few arrangements and instrumental pieces.  His most important musical composition was his 1922 setting of Trees, the popular poem by Joyce Kilmer, published by G. Schirmer.  It was performed and recorded by many important singers of the 20th century, such as Ernestine Schumann-Heink, John Charles Thomas, Nelson Eddy, Robert Merrill, Paul Robeson, Richard Tauber and Mario Lanza.  More recently, tenor John Aler recorded it on a program entitled Songs we Forgot to Remember, and Julian Lloyd Webber included an instrumental version for cello and piano on his Unexpected Songs cd.

Musical compositions

Songs for voice and piano

April (text by Elsie M. Fowler), 1932
Beloved (text by Josephine Johnson), 1941
Crossing the Bar (text by Alfred, Lord Tennyson), 1939
Debt (text by Sara Teasdale), 1926
Discovery (text by Gilean Douglas), 1945
The Eagle, (text by Alfred, Lord Tennyson), unpublished manuscript
Gifts (text by Juliana Horatia Ewing), 1930
The Greater Thing (text by C.T. Davis), 1941
The Laughing Brook (text by Elizabeth Ellis Scantlebury), 1926, B.F. Wood Music Co. publisher
The Look (text by Sara Teasdale), 1925
Love Shall Light the Haven (Prothalamium) (text by Leigh Hanes), 1936
Motherhood
Mountains (text by Leigh Hanes), 1930
Overtones (text by William Alexander Percy), 1929
Prelude in March (text by Gilean Douglas), 1941
Promise, 1932
The Redwoods (text by J. B. Strauss), 1937, Sherman, Clay & Co. publisher
Trees (text by Joyce Kilmer), 1922
A Wanderer's Song (text by John Masefield)
When I am dead, my dearest (text by Christina Rossetti), 1941

Piano solo
Barefoot Boy, 1939
Day Dreams, 1938, Willis Music publisher (John Thompson's students series for the piano)
El Burrito, 1941
Étude Mélodique, 1946
Evening at Padua Hills, 1939
Folk-Song Sonatinas (In Colonial Days, etc.), 1943
From 'way Down South (Turkey in the Straw), 1934
The Old Mill Wheel, 1934
Pleading, 1934
Scherzo, 1921
Spanish Nights, 1934
Tango, 1936
Valse Charlene, 1936
Valse Elaine, 1938
The Village Blacksmith, 1939
Waltz Improvisation
Wishing
Woods at Night, 1938

Musical arrangements
España (Emmanuel Chabrier), for piano solo
Sigh No More, Ladies (James H. Rogers/Shakespeare), for women's chorus, 1959
The Skaters (Emil Waldteufel), for piano solo, 1941
Thou, too, sail on, O Ship of State! (text by Henry Wadsworth Longfellow) (Engelbert Humperdinck, "Abends, will ich schlafen gehn" from Hansel and Gretel), for women's chorus, 1943
You and You (Johann Strauss II, Die Fledermaus), for piano solo

Other works
Dawn Boy, Indian Operetta in 2 Acts and 3 Scenes (book and lyrics by C. Allen), 1933
Gifts, violin and piano
Open House, operetta
Songs Without Words, string ensemble with piano (arr. by Louis Hintze), 1937

Filmography
His song Trees was used in 10 film and television productions:

The In-Laws, 1979 (uncredited)
All in the Family (TV series), "The Bunkers Go West", 1978 (uncredited)
Perry Como's Kraft Music Hall (TV series), Episode dated 21 March 1959 (uncredited)
Melody Time, 1948
Blondie in Society, 1941
Woman Chases Man, 1937 (uncredited)
Toyland Broadcast (short), 1934 (uncredited)
The Tree's Knees (short), 1931
Dorothy Whitmore (short), 1928
Mme. Ernestine Schumann-Heink (short), 1927

Footnotes

References

.

http://www.imdb.com/name/nm0711017/

People from Dayton, Kentucky
Songwriters from Kentucky
1888 births
1975 deaths
People from San Marino, California
Songwriters from California